Allegro barbaro is a 1979 Hungarian drama film directed by Miklós Jancsó.The film starring György Cserhalmi, Zsuzsa Czinkóczi, Lajos Balázsovits, Georgiana Tarjan, István Kovács in the lead roles.

Cast
 György Cserhalmi as Zsadányi István
 Zsuzsa Czinkóczi as Bankós Mari
 Georgiana Tarjan as Tarján Györgyi
 Lajos Balázsovits as Zsadányi Gábor
 István Kovács as Komár István gróf
 István Bujtor as Hédervári
 Bertalan Solti as Öreg Bankós
 László Horváth as Kovács

References

External links
 

1970s Hungarian-language films
1979 films
1979 drama films
Hungarian drama films